Charlotte Cecilia Pitcairn Leitch (13 April 1891 – 16 September 1977) was a British amateur golfer. She was born in Silloth, Cumberland, England, the daughter of a local physician and one of three sisters who excelled at the game of golf. Leitch won 12 national titles as well as five French Ladies Amateurs and one Canadian Women's Amateur.

Early life
Leitch was born on 13 April 1891, at Monimail, Silloth, Cumberland, England,  the sixth of the seven children of Dr. John Leitch (1849–1896), a doctor and botanist and Catherine Edith Redford (1858–1937). She was educated at home and at Carlisle Girls' High School. She became proficient at golf at an early age, and played the Silloth course with her sisters who were also avid golfers.

Golf career

In 1914 she won the first of her four British Ladies Amateurs, taking the title from Muriel Dodd. Her opportunity to possibly win several more was interrupted for five years during World War I. When the Championship was restarted after the war, she won her second straight title then the following year made it three in a row. Leitch was able to reach the Championship finals on six occasions, and in 1926 won her fourth British title, a record she shares with Joyce Wethered. She received golf lessons from Thomas Renouf, the head professional at Silloth.

Later life
Leitch retired having won 12 national titles plus she captured five French Ladies Amateurs and one Canadian Women's Amateur. She wrote two books on golf, the first titled Golf was published in 1922 in Philadelphia and London by J. B. Lippincott & Co. and the second titled Golf Simplified was published in London by Thornton Butterworth in 1924.

Death
She died on 16 September 1977 at her home in London.

References

External links
 Silloth on Solway Golf Club

English female golfers
Winners of ladies' major amateur golf championships
English non-fiction writers
Sportspeople from Cumbria
People from Silloth
1891 births
1977 deaths